is a lake, situated near Ōmachi, Nagano, Japan, and located at the foot of the northern Japanese Alps mountain range. Mesotrophic and subalpine in nature, numerous lakeside attractions surround the lake, with the locale being a popular lakeside resort. Kizaki is also one of the "Nishina Three Lakes", which include Lake Aoki and Lake Nakatsuna.

Geography
Lake Kizaki has a maximum length of 2.7 km and a maximum width of 1.2 km, with the altitude of its surface reaching 764 m and its catchment area being 22 square kilometers.

Transport

See also
 Onegai Teacher, also known as Please Teacher!, anime series which is set in Lake Kizaki and features the lake comprehensively, as well as numerous locations across the region.
 Onegai Twins, also known as Please Twins!, anime series, sequel to Onegai Teacher, which is set in Lake Kizaki and features the lake prominently, with the main storyline featuring the lake comprehensively. as well as numerous locations across the region.
 Waiting in the Summer, also known as Ano Natsu De Matteru, anime series, with screenwriter Yōsuke Kuroda and character designer Taraku Uon whom both took part in the original Please! series, although does not take part in the same setting as above two series, Lake Kizaki plays a significant role in the plot.

External links

 Kizaki-ko (Lake Kizaki) at World Lakes Database
 Data Summary of Kizaki-ko (Lake Kizaki) at World Lakes Database
 Lake Kizaki, Limnology and Ecology, book, by Yatsuka Sajo and Hayashi H.

Kizaki
Kizaki
Kizaki
Tourist attractions in Nagano Prefecture
Ōmachi, Nagano